Wabern, or Wabern bei Bern, is a village in the municipality of Köniz in the Swiss canton of Bern.

Wabern is served by Wabern bei Bern railway station, on line S3 of the Bern S-Bahn, and by Bern tramway route 9. It is also the gateway to the Gurten, the nearest mountain to Bern, to which it is linked by the Gurten Funicular.

References

External links
Community web portal for Wabern (in German)

Villages in the canton of Bern
Köniz